The 10th Canadian Parliament was in session from January 11, 1905, until September 17, 1908. The membership was set by the 1904 federal election on November 3, 1904. It was dissolved prior to the 1908 election.

It was controlled by a Liberal Party majority under Prime Minister Sir Wilfrid Laurier and the 8th Canadian Ministry.  The Official Opposition was the Conservative/Liberal-Conservative, led by Robert Borden.

The Speaker was Robert Franklin Sutherland.  See also List of Canadian electoral districts 1903-1907 for a list of the ridings in this parliament.

There were four sessions of the 10th Parliament:

Major legislation

Alberta Act 

The Alberta Act, S. C. 1905, c. 3 established the new province of Alberta, effective September 1, 1905. Its long title is An Act to establish and provide for the government of the Province of Alberta. The Act received royal assent on July 20, 1905.  The Alberta Act is part of the Constitution of Canada.

Saskatchewan Act 

The Saskatchewan Act, S. C. 1905, c. 42 established the new province of Saskatchewan, effective September 1, 1905. Its long title is An Act to establish and provide for the government of the Province of Saskatchewan. The Act received royal assent on July 20, 1905.  The Saskatchewan Act is part of the Constitution of Canada.

Juvenile Delinquents Act 

The Juvenile Delinquents Act, S.C. 1908, c. 40 was a law passed by the Parliament of Canada to improve its handling of juvenile crime. The act established procedures for the handling of juvenile offenses, including the government assuming control of juvenile offenders. It was revised in 1929 and superseded in 1984 by the Young Offenders Act.

List of members

Following is a full list of members of the tenth Parliament listed first by province, then by electoral district.

Electoral districts denoted by an asterisk (*) indicates that district was represented by two members.

Alberta/Saskatchewan
Alberta and Saskatchewan were established as Canadian provinces on 1 September 1905 from parts of what had formerly been the Northwest Territories. The old NWT electoral districts were not formally abolished until the 1907 redistribution, which took the provincial boundary into account. In the meantime, three by-elections were held in districts which straddled the new border.

British Columbia

Manitoba

New Brunswick

Northwest Territories
The regions of the Northwest Territories represented in Parliament became the provinces of Alberta and Saskatchewan on 1 September 1905. Except in cases where the members resigned, NWT MP's continued to represent constituencies using the 1903 boundaries until the dissolution of the 10th Parliament.

Nova Scotia

Ontario

Prince Edward Island

Quebec

Yukon

By-elections

References

Further reading

Succession

Canadian parliaments
1905 establishments in Canada
1908 disestablishments in Canada
1905 in Canada
1906 in Canada
1907 in Canada
1908 in Canada